is a Japanese professional baseball pitcher for the Orix Buffaloes in Japan's Nippon Professional Baseball.

External links

NPB.com

1982 births
Living people
Baseball people from Okinawa Prefecture
Japanese baseball players
Nippon Professional Baseball pitchers
Orix Buffaloes players